Yakama Manty Jones ( Mara) is a Sierra Leonean multipotentialite living this through her portfolio career. Jones is an economist, entrepreneur and philanthropist with a PhD in finance and economics. She is the Director of Research and Delivery at the Sierra Leone Ministry of Finance and Focal Person for the World Bank's Human Capital Project in Sierra Leone.  In 2021, she was selected as an Amujae leader by the EJS Center. Jones has authored and co-authored multiple scholarly articles and spoken at TEDxYouth, Africa Oxford Initiative, and the World Bank.

Early life and education 
Yakama Manty Jones was born in Sierra Leone. She attended the Tower Hill Kindergarten and Primary School, where she sat to the National Primary School Examinations (NPSE). Jones enrolled at Limount College, sat to the London G.C.E O’ Level Examinations, and emerged the best candidate in the country. She then attended Fourah Bay College, University of Sierra Leone, where she earned her bachelor's degree with Honours in Economics.

Jones went on to earn post-graduate qualifications (Master of Science in Finance and Economics, Master of Research in International Business & Development) from the University of Manchester and the University of London (Queen Mary & Westfield College, Birkbeck College). Yakama's PhD thesis focused on Debt Overhang and the ‘Resource Curse Hypothesis. Jones has completed a Certificate in Social Entrepreneurship from the University of Oxford and an Executive Certificate in Economic Development from Harvard Kennedy School.

Career 
Jones has held several consulting roles. She served as Data Management Specialist on the Former President Ernest Bai Koroma's Post- Ebola Recovery Delivery Team, the President's Recovery Priorities. She was promoted to Information Management and Quality Assurance Specialist and eventually Delivery Team Lead after current Mayor of Freetown, Her Worship Yvonne Aki-Sawyerr.

Jones serves as Director of Research and Delivery at the Ministry of Finance  in Sierra Leone. She is also an Associate Lecturer in the Department of Economics and Commerce at Fourah Bay College, University of Sierra Leone. Additionally, she is the Team Lead for the Economic Policy pathway on the University of Sierra Leone's Master of Research and Public Policy (MRPP) collaborative Masters program with the Partnership of African Social and Governance Research (PASGR).

Jones is also an entrepreneur and co-founded the Peninsular Innovative Group (PI Group) with her husband, Herbert Jones. The PI Group operates across the shipping, manufacturing, and agri-business industries in Sierra Leone. Jones founded the Yak Jones Foundation, promoting reading and child literacy by donating books to needy schools, organising reading, comprehension and quiz competitions, and establishing book clubs. The Foundation has worked with Project Pikin's Safe Space Library to provide reading materials for Freetown's street children and the Rotary Club Sunset of Freetown to establish a school library.

Jones is a Senior Research Fellow at the Centre for Alternative Policy Research and Innovation and a certified mentor on Mentor-X Africa   She also currently serves on the boards of the Children's Education Foundation, Asmaa James Foundation, Girls Plus and several schools. Jones has given lectures locally and internationally with organizations such as the United Nations Population Fund (UNFPA), the Blavatnik School of Government, University of Oxford, the Tony Blair Institute for Global Change, and the World Bank on issues such as education, entrepreneurship, human capital development, service delivery.

Personal life 
Jones is married to Herbert Durosimi Jones. Together they have two daughters, Hedya-Gold and Hedsania-Silver Jones. Jones was a 2017 Sierra Leone Open Government Fellow, in  the Open Data Fellowship Programme between Code for Africa, Google News Lab, Story Lab Academy and the World Bank. She was named one of 50 Most Influential Young Sierra Leoneans, one of the 50 Most Influential Women in Sierra Leone, one of the 100 Most Influential Young Sierra Leoneans, recognized for excellence and integrity by Youth in Governance-SL and featuring on the 100 Women in West Africa list.

Research interests 
Jones' research interests include: Development Economics, International Business, Human Capital Development, Macro and Micro-level data analysis for growth dynamics,  Building data systems and innovative growth metrics, Innovation and Systems Approaches to Public Service Delivery and  Human-Centered Design.

References

Living people
Sierra Leonean women academics
Sierra Leonean economists
Academic staff of Fourah Bay College
Women economists
Fourah Bay College alumni
Alumni of Birkbeck, University of London
Year of birth missing (living people)